The 71st Giro d'Italia, an annual multiple-stage bicycle race that is one of the sport's Grand Tours, occurred in 1988. 

The race started in Urbino, on 23 May, with a  individual time trial and concluded in Vittorio Veneto, on 12 June, with a  individual time trial. A total of 180 riders from 20 teams entered the 21-stage race, which was won by American Andrew Hampsten of the  team. The second and third places were taken by Dutchman Erik Breukink and Swiss Urs Zimmermann, respectively. It was the third time – and second successive year – in the history of the Giro that the podium was occupied solely by non-Italian riders.

In the first half of the race, the overall classification had been headed for several days by Massimo Podenzana. He had participated in a breakaway during stage 4a, which won him sufficient time to hold the race leader's maglia rosa for more than a week. Franco Chioccioli then wore the pink jersey for two stages before Hampsten took the general classification lead after the fourteenth stage. The fourteenth stage of the 1988 Giro, conducted in adverse weather including a snowstorm, has been recognized as an iconic event in the history of the Giro. After this stage, Hampsten began to build up a solid two-minute barrier against the second-placed rider, Breukink. This gap was sufficient to win Hampsten the race, despite losing around twenty seconds in the final two stages.

Hampsten became the first American, and non-European, to win the Giro. He also won the secondary mountains and combination classifications, as well as the special sprints classification. In the other classifications, Fanini–Seven Up rider Stefano Tomasini of Italy placed ninth overall to finish as the best neo-professional in the general classification, Johan van der Velde of the Gisgelati–Ecoflam team was the winner of the points classification, and  finished as the winners of the team classification.

Teams

Twenty teams were invited by the race organizers to participate in the 1988 edition of the Giro d'Italia, twelve of which were based outside of Italy. Each team sent a squad of nine riders, which meant that the race started with a peloton of 180 cyclists. In total, 82 of the starters were foreign, while the remaining 98 were Italian. Aside from Italy, Switzerland (17), Spain (12), and the Netherlands (11) all had more than 10 riders. 

Of those starting, 54 were riding the Giro d'Italia for the first time. The average age of riders was 26.94 years, ranging from 21–year–old Angelo Lecchi from Del Tongo–Colnago to 37–year–old Pierino Gavazzi of Fanini–Seven Up. The presentation of the teams – where each team's roster and manager were introduced in front of the media and local dignitaries – took place on 22 May, in the courtyard of the Ducal Palace in Urbino. From the riders that began the race, 125 made it to the finish in Vittorio Veneto.

The teams entering the race were:

Pre-race favorites

The starting peloton did not include the 1987 winner, Stephen Roche, who was sidelined for the majority of the 1988 season with a knee injury. l'Unità writer Gino Sala, author Bill McGann and an El Mundo Deportivo writer named several riders as contenders for the overall classification, including Andrew Hampsten, Urs Zimmermann, Erik Breukink, Franco Chioccioli, and Pedro Delgado. Sala believed Jean-François Bernard came into the Giro in great shape and that the French rider could win the race if he could do well in the time trials and the mountains. In addition, Bernard Hinault told Sala that if Jean Francois could do well in this edition of the Giro, he could one day lead a team in the Tour de France. Former Giro champion Gianni Motta thought Hampsten would win because of the effort he was expected to make on the Gavia Pass stage. Motta believed that Hampsten would excel there, while the Italian riders – the majority of the peloton – would not because they did not realize its difficulty and thought the Gavia was "just another climb".

The 1986 Tour de France winner Greg LeMond entered the race with his  squad, after a break from cycling due to injuries sustained in a hunting accident. Due to this, Sala did not see him as a front-runner for the overall victory. Swiss rider Tony Rominger also partook in the race and was considered by McGann and Sala as a dark-horse candidate for the victory after experiencing success at the beginning of his season. Guido Bontempi was seen by Sala as a favorite to win a couple of stages. Before he injured his right knee earlier in the season during the Tour de Romandie, many newspapers also believed Moreno Argentin to be a favorite to take several stages. Stampa Sera writer Curzio Maltese believed that Flavio Giupponi could take one of the stages containing many categorized climbs which award mountains classification points, if properly supported by his team Del Tongo–Colnago.

During the presentation of the teams, the riders were asked to choose their top picks for the overall victory. Roberto Visentini garnered the most votes from his fellow riders, but Delgado, Hampsten and LeMond also received many votes. Many media outlets felt that the overall victory would likely go to a non-Italian rider due to the lack of Italian general classification competitors, but that Visentini had the best chance of winning out of competing Italians.

Route and stages

The route for the 1988 edition of the Giro d'Italia was revealed to the public on television by head organizer Vincenzo Torriani, on 5 March 1988. It contained four time trial events, three of which were individual and one a team event. The race organizers hoped that the number of time trials, including one on the last day, would keep the race hotly contested to the end. There were fifteen stages containing thirty categorized climbs, of which four had summit finishes: stage 6, to Campitello Matese; stage 12, to Selvino; stage 13, to Chiesa in Valmalenco; and stage 15, to the Merano 2000 mountain. Another stage with a mountain-top finish was stage 18, which consisted of a climbing time trial to Valico del Vetriolo. The organizers chose to not include any rest days. When compared to the previous year's race, the race was  shorter, contained one fewer rest day and individual time trial, and lacked a prologue. In addition, this race contained one fewer stage, but one more set of half stages. The race was televised in parts of Europe by Italy's national public broadcasting service, RAI.

The eleventh stage between Parma and Colle Don Bosco was cancelled due to protests near the finish line. The fifteenth stage was originally intended to be  and to start in Bormio. The route originally had the riders crossing the Stelvio Pass, but it was skipped due to snowdrifts that had developed on the roads. Excluding the finish on the Merano 2000, the stage was relatively flat after the adjustments.

In previous years, the organizers had made the race easier for the Italian favorites by including fewer hard climbs. With the absence of Italian Francesco Moser from this edition, the race organizers included many famous and difficult climbs, such as the Gavia Pass. Moser himself stated that the route contained many difficult climbs and was not helping Italian cycling to prosper at a time when he believed it to be ailing. When asked about the route for the 1988 edition,  rider Bob Roll said "Those sons of bitches put every mountain they could find in the race that year." Three-time winner Gino Bartali also believed the route to be very difficult and in favor of non-Italian competitors. Gino Sala also felt the route was harsher than in years past and that the team time trial could influence the overall classification greatly. La Stampa writer Gian Paolo Ormezzano praised the route saying it was beautiful and well crafted but contained one flaw, in that the race did not finish in any major Italian city. He also expressed his delight with the uphill time trial to Valico del Vetriolo as well as the inclusion of the Stelvio, Rombo and Gavia mountain passes.

Race overview

The Giro began with a  time trial in the city of Urbino, which was won by Jean-François Bernard with a three-second margin over Tony Rominger. Guido Bontempi won the second stage and moved to third overall, while Bernard gained a five-second buffer over the second-placed rider, Rominger. In stage 4a, Massimo Podenzana soloed to victory in Rodi Garganico, five minutes ahead of the second-place finisher. This victory and the respective time bonus allowed Podenzana to gain the maglia rosa, which he held until stage 12. Podenzana's lead shrunk to a little over two minutes after his team, Atala–Ofmega, finished two minutes and thirty-six seconds behind Del Tongo–Colnago.

The eleventh stage was run without problems until the final mile, when environmentalist protestors occupied the finish line and forced the annulment of the stage. The protestors were upset with a nearby factory, owned by chemical manufacturer Montedison, which the protestors claimed had been polluting the Bormida river. The next stage was marked by the appearance of the major mountains and by Pondenzana conceding the maglia rosa to Franco Chioccioli. The ensuing stages saw the general classification shift more frequently due to the intensity of the mountains and fatigue.

The fourteenth stage was memorable for its extreme weather, most notably on the final climb of the Gavia Pass. Overnight, a large amount of snow had accumulated on the Gavia, but the roads were cleared in time for the riders. Despite the cold and adverse weather forecast, the patron, Vincenzo Torriani, decided to go ahead with the stage. Although Breukink won the stage, Hampsten made the bigger story by becoming the first American to don the maglia rosa in the history of the Giro d'Italia. Conditions were so bad that one rider, Toshiba–Look's Dominique Gaigne, had to be carried on his bike into a shelter as his hands were frozen gripping the handlebars and former winner Giuseppe Saronni even stopped at a spectator's house and returned with a glass of the Italian liqueur Grappa.

The start of the fifteenth stage was moved ahead from Bormio to Spondigna, because of snow covering the Stelvio Pass, but the summit finish in Merano was maintained. As soon as the climb started, Bernard, Urs Zimmermann and Chioccioli attacked. Bernard eventually shook off the two riders and won the stage, but with minimal time gain. The sixteenth stage was marked by rain – which turned into snow as the peloton rose higher – and by two protests while climbing the Rombo Pass. Near the summit of the last climb, Hampsten and a few others formed an escape group that was eventually caught in the final kilometers. The group raced into Innsbruck, where Franco Vona made a last minute attack that won him the stage. Bernard – who was in sixth place overall at the start of the seventeenth stage – crashed in a tunnel but managed to finish the stage; however, the following day he did not start the leg and withdrew from the race.

The eighteenth stage, an  individual time trial, would prove critical in deciding the overall winner of the Giro. Going into the stage, Hampsten led the race by 42 seconds over Breukink, a margin that was increased by a further 32 seconds after the time trial. The nineteenth stage featured three categorized climbs. Zimmermann attacked on the first, the Duran Pass, but was caught later by Stefano Giuliani who bridged the gap on the descent of the Duran. The two riders rode to the finish together in Arta Terme. Although Giuliani won the stage, Zimmermann moved into second place overall, after gaining over three minutes on the general classification contenders.

The twentieth stage came down to a sprint finish, won by Paolo Rosola, who was later disqualified as his teammate, Roberto Pagnin, was found to have pushed him during the sprint. As a result, the second-place finisher, Alessio Di Basco, was awarded the stage victory. The penultimate stage was completely flat and culminated in a bunch sprint, won by Urs Freuler. Hours later, the final stage – a hilly  individual time trial – took place. The weather conditions were fine for the majority of the riders, but as the general classification contenders were on the course, it began to lightning and rain heavily. There was a tricky descent about  into the stage, which became more dangerous with the rain and ultimately resulted in the crashes of Giupponi and Zimmerman. The time lost by Zimmermann cost him his second place overall. Lech Piasecki, who rode the course when dry, won the stage by a wide margin. Hampsten lost twenty seconds to Breukink, but it did not prevent him from becoming the first American to win the Giro d'Italia. The other podium positions were filled by non-Italian riders for the second year in a row and the third time in the history of the race. Breukink had been part of the non-Italian podium in 1987, behind Ireland's Stephen Roche and Great Britain's Robert Millar.

Stage success was limited to eleven of the competing teams, seven of which achieved multiple victories. Four individual riders won multiple stages: Bernard (stages 1, 8 and 15), Bontempi (stages 2 and 5), Hampsten (stages 12 and 18), and Di Basco (stages 9 and 20).  won three stages with Bernard and stage 7 with Andreas Kappes.  won two stages, with Breukink in stage 14, and Freuler in stage 21a.  won three stages, with a solo breakaway by Rominger in stage 13; Vona in stage 16, and Giuliani in stage 19. Del Tongo–Colnago also won multiple stages, with Chioccioli in stage 6, Piasecki in stage 21b, and the team time trial in stage 4b.
Selca–Ciclolinea, Ceramiche Ariostea, Gewiss-Bianchi and Atala–Ofmega won one stage apiece. Ceramiche Ariostea rider Stephan Joho took stage 3 in a sprint finish, as did Gewiss-Bianchi rider Rosola in stage 10, and Selca–Ciclolinea 's Patrizio Gambirasio in stage 17. Atala–Ofmega's Podenzana won stage 4a after a solo breakaway.

Doping
The race organizers performed anti-doping controls throughout the race. Riders would be selected after a stage and have thirty minutes to get tested. The results generally would be returned between thirty and sixty minutes later. No rider tested positive in this edition of the Giro, but had this happened, the following penalties would have been applied: the rider would be demoted to last place of the stage, given a ten-minute penalty in the general classification, a lengthy suspension, and a fine of one thousand francs. Although no riders tested positive, Roberto Visentini, Flavio Giupponi and Urs Zimmermann – who placed second, third and fourth, respectively, in the eighteenth stage – showed up too late for their control tests and were given the penalties corresponding to riders testing positive; after complaints and threats to leave the race from their team leaders, the jury later reverted their decision, and no penalty was given.

Classification leadership

Five different jerseys were worn during the 1988 Giro d'Italia. The leader of the general classification – calculated by adding the stage finish times of each rider, and allowing time bonuses for the first three finishers on mass-start stages – wore a pink jersey. The time bonuses for the 1988 Giro were fifteen seconds for first, ten seconds for second, and five seconds for third place on the stage. This classification is the most important of the race, and its winner is considered as the winner of the Giro.

For the points classification, which awarded a purple (or cyclamen) jersey to its leader, cyclists were given points for finishing a stage in the top 15; additional points could also be won in intermediate sprints. The green jersey was awarded to the mountains classification leader. In this ranking, points were won by reaching the summit of a climb ahead of other cyclists. Each climb was ranked as either first, second or third category, with more points available for higher category climbs. The Cima Coppi, the race's highest point of elevation, carried more points than the other first category climbs. The Cima Coppi for this edition of the Giro was supposed to be the Stelvio Pass, however the day the peloton was supposed to climb it, heavy snow cover forced the organization to omit it from the stage. The white jersey was worn by the leader of young rider classification, a ranking decided the same way as the general classification, but considering only neo-professional cyclists (in their first three years of professional racing).

The combination classification, represented by a blue jersey, was calculated by summing up the points obtained by each rider in the other classifications; the leader was the rider with the lowest total of points.
Although no jersey was awarded, there was also one classification for the teams, in which the stage finish times of the best three cyclists per team were added; the leading team was the one with the lowest total time.

Final standings

General classification

Points classification

Mountains classification

Young rider classification

Team classification

Combination classification

Special sprints classification

Intermediate sprints classification

Combativity classification

Aftermath

After the race, Andrew Hampsten told El Mundo Deportivo that he believed this was the biggest win of his career so far and thought he could win the upcoming Tour de France. Hampsten stated that Jean-François Bernard and Pedro Delgado both lacked awareness when attacking in the mountains and did not make the most of the time trials, but believed they would be more active in the Tour de France. In addition, Hampsten thought Bernard and Roberto Visentini did not perform to their expectations. He did not go on to win the Tour de France, but placed fifteenth overall. Runner-up Erik Breukink commented that he was satisfied with his second-place finish, but "Hampsten was simply better at the decisive moments". In addition, Breukink stated he came to the race in order to prepare for the Tour de France in July. At the Tour, he finished in twelfth overall and won the young rider classification for being the highest ranked rider in the general classification under the age of 25. Third place finisher Urs Zimmermann reflected on the race and stated that his chance of winning the overall race were gone after the Gavia stage. l'Unita writer Gino Sala looked back on the race and believed Delgado did not perform well and was not a serious threat to win the race. Luis Gómez, a writer for El País, thought Delgado did not prepare properly for the Giro.

In 2012, the organizer of the Giro d'Italia, RCS Sport, did a survey on the greatest moments in the history of the Giro by interviewing over 100 journalists. The 1988 race was mentioned several times as one of the most memorable, with the journalists citing the fourteenth stage that traversed the Gavia Pass as the highlight. Several writers have referred to the fourteenth stage as being "epic" or "iconic" due to the weather conditions the riders battled over difficult climbs and unpaved roads to finish the stage. According to CyclingNews writer Jason Sumner, a photo from the fourteenth stage depicting the future winner Andrew Hampsten climbing the Gavia while a snowstorm blows in the foreground has become a widely known image that even casual cycling fans would recognize. After the stage, La Gazzetta dello Sport called the stage "The Day the Big Men Cried", with the stage still being commonly referred to as such.

References

Footnotes

Citations

Bibliography

 
 
 
 

 
Giro d'Italia
Giro d'Italia
Giro d'Italia by year
Giro d'Italia
Giro d'Italia